HMS Hambledon has been the name of more than one ship of the British Royal Navy, and may refer to:

 , a minesweeper launched in 1917 and sold in 1922
 , an escort destroyer in commission from 1940 to 1945 that served during World War II

Royal Navy ship names